The Portugal national women's rugby union team are a national sporting side of Portugal, representing them at rugby union. They played their first test in 1995 against Germany.

History

Portugal played their first test match on 14 May 1995 against Germany, they were thrashed 50–0 in Heidelberg. After 26 years of inactivity, Portugal returned to the international scene on December 2021, they defeated Belgium 10–8 in Lisbon.

Portugal competed at the 2021–22 Rugby Europe Women's Trophy, they defeated Belgium and Germany. Portugal recorded their biggest win at the 2022–23 Rugby Europe Women's Trophy when they defeated Belgium 71–5.

Portugal made an amazing gain in their rankings in 2022 when they jumped up 19 places to 30th after their record win over Belgium.

Record

Overall 
(Full internationals only)

Results

Full internationals

Other matches

References

External links
Federação Portuguesa de Rugby Official Site 

European national women's rugby union teams
national
Women's national rugby union teams
R